Cicala Filmworks is an independent film production company based in New York City. Feature film credits include My Last Day Without You (2011), Get a Job (2011), Michael Imperioli's debut The Hungry Ghosts (2009), Olaf de Fleur's The Amazing Truth About Queen Raquela (2008), Arranged (2007), and Confess (2005). Documentaries include Even Though the Whole World Is Burning (2014) and Contested Streets (2006), which was broadcast as part of "The Green" on The Sundance Channel. Founded in 1997 by Stefan Schaefer and Diane Crespo, the company has also created promotional content for clients such as The Guggenheim Museum, The New York Yankees, The March of Dimes, among many others.

External links 
 Official Website
 Internet Movie Data Base
 Arranged Official Website
 Queen Raquela Official Website, North America
 Queen Raquela Official Website, International
 Variety review of Arranged

Companies based in New York City
Mass media companies established in 1997
Film production companies of the United States